Plagiomimicus mimica is a species of moth in the family Noctuidae (the owlet moths). It is found in North America.

The MONA or Hodges number for Plagiomimicus mimica is 9755.1.

References

Further reading

 
 
 

Amphipyrinae
Articles created by Qbugbot
Moths described in 1995
Moths of North America